MDB Communications is an American advertising and communications agency based in Washington, D.C. Founded in 1981, the agency was named in Inc. Magazine's "Inc. 500" list in 1998  and was also recognized on Advertising Age's "Top US Agency Brands by Revenue" in 2007.

History

MDB Communications was founded in 1981 by Michael David Brown as a graphic design business. In 1987, current CEO Cary Hatch acquired the company and remodeled MDB into a full-service advertising agency.

Located at 900 19th Street, NW in downtown Washington, D.C. MDB Communications CCO, Richard Coad is the person credited with the architecture, strategy and creation of the concept that brought Subway Restaurants to national prominence.

References

Advertising agencies of the United States
Privately held companies based in Washington, D.C.
Marketing companies established in 1981
1981 establishments in Washington, D.C.